Truth Is a Beautiful Thing is the second studio album by English indie pop band London Grammar. It was released on 9 June 2017 by the trio's imprint Metal & Dust and Ministry of Sound.

Singles
"Rooting for You" was released as the album's lead single on 1 January 2017. It peaked at number 58 on the UK Singles Chart. The album's second single, "Big Picture", was released on 1 February 2017, reaching number 73 on the UK Singles Chart. "Truth Is a Beautiful Thing" was released as the third single on 24 March 2017. "Oh Woman Oh Man" was released as the fourth single on 21 April 2017, peaking at number 85 on the UK Singles Chart. On 11 August 2017, "Non Believer" was sent to UK contemporary hit radio as the album's fifth single. The album's sixth single, "Hell to the Liars", was serviced to UK contemporary hit radio on 1 December 2017, followed by a digital release on 8 December.

Commercial performance
Truth Is a Beautiful Thing debuted at number one on the UK Albums Chart with first-week sales of 43,403 copies, including 2,780 from sales-equivalent streams.

Track listing

Notes
  signifies a co-producer
  signifies a vocal producer
  signifies an additional vocal producer
  signifies an additional producer

Personnel
Credits adapted from the liner notes of the deluxe edition of Truth Is a Beautiful Thing.

London Grammar
 Hannah Reid – vocals ; piano 
 Daniel Rothman – guitars
 Dot Major – drums, programming ; piano ; Rhodes

Additional musicians

 Paul Epworth – drums, programming ; additional programming 
 Greg Kurstin – piano, Mellotron, Chamberlin, Orchestron, Juno-60 
 Wil Malone – string arrangements, string conducting 
 Lucie Švehlová – concertmaster 
 City of Prague Philharmonic Orchestra – strings 
 Myriot (Tim Bran and Roy Kerr) – additional programming

Technical

 Jan Holzner – string recording 
 London Grammar – production ; mixing 
 Paul Epworth – production 
 Jon Hopkins – production, mixing 
 Myriot (Tim Bran and Roy Kerr) – production ; co-production ; additional vocal production ; additional production 
 Greg Kurstin – production, engineering 
 Ben Baptie – production ; mixing ; additional engineering 
 Simon Askew – production 
 Tom Elmhirst – vocal production; vocal mixing ; mixing 
 Brandon Bost – mix assistance 
 Andy Menhenitt – mix assistance ; engineering assistance 
 Matt Wiggins – mixing ; engineering 
 Joseph Hartwell Jones – engineering 
 Riley MacIntyre – additional engineering ; engineering 
 Joe Visciano – engineering for mix 
 Manon Grandjean – engineering ; vocal recording 
 Luke Pickering – engineering assistance 
 Alex Pasco – engineering 
 Julian Burg – engineering 
 Tom Coyne – mastering 
 Kevin Tuffy – mastering

Artwork
 Eliot Lee Hazel – cover photo
 Alexandra Waespi – inside photos
 Harry Hall – inside photos
 Leif Podhajsky – creative direction, layout

Charts

Weekly charts

Year-end charts

Certifications

Release history

Notes

References

2017 albums
Albums produced by Greg Kurstin
Albums produced by Jon Hopkins
Albums produced by Paul Epworth
London Grammar albums
Ministry of Sound albums
Albums recorded at The Church Studios